Jürgen Schröder may refer to:

Jürgen Schröder (politician) (born 1940), German politician
Jürgen Schröder (rower) (born 1940), German rower
Jürgen Schröder (water polo) (born 1960), German water polo player